Macalla is a 1985 musical album by Irish folk group Clannad. It is their ninth album and became prominent with a collaboration between Clannad's singer Moya Brennan and U2 vocalist Bono on the duet "In a Lifetime". Furthermore, it featured some internationally renowned artists such as art rock saxophone player Mel Collins, an ex-King Crimson member and famous for his solo on The Rolling Stones' "Miss You", and Anton Corbijn's photography. An alternate version of the album's first track, "Caisleán Óir", was used throughout the third Robin of Sherwood series.

The album's title is Irish for "echo". Two of its songs are sung entirely in Irish: "Caisleán Óir", which translates as "golden castle", and "Buachaill Ón Éirne", which means "shepherd from the Erne".

Track listing 

 "Caisleán Óir" (Ciarán Brennan, Máire Brennan) – 2:06
 "The Wild Cry" (Pól Brennan) – 4:41
 "Closer to Your Heart" (C. Brennan) – 3:29
 "In a Lifetime" (a duet with Bono) (C. Brennan, P. Brennan) – 3:08
 "Almost Seems (Too Late to Turn)" (P. Brennan) – 4:51
 "Indoor" (P. Brennan) – 3:53
 "Buachaill Ón Éirne" (Traditional) – 3:08
 "Blackstairs" (P. Brennan) – 4:15
 "Journey's End" (Noel Duggan, Pádraig Duggan) – 2:42
 "Northern Skyline" (C. Brennan, P. Brennan) – 4:58
 "Caisleán Óir – Planet Heaven Mix" (bonus track available only on 2003 Deluxe Edition) – 7:04

Charts

Singles
 "Closer to Your Heart" (September 1985)
 "Almost Seems (Too Late to Turn)" (November 1985)
 "In a Lifetime" (January 1986)

Personnel

Band
 Ciarán Ó Braonáin – bass, guitar, keyboards, vocals
 Máire Ní Bhronáin – vocals, harp
 Pól Ó Braonáin – flute, guitar, percussion, vocals
 Noel Ó Dúgáin – guitar, vocals
 Pádraig Ó Dúgáin – guitar, mandolin, vocals

Additional Musicians
 Bono – vocals
 Mel Collins – saxophone
 Danny Cummings – percussion
 James Delaney – keyboards, synthesizer
 Anto Drennan – guitar, electric guitar
 Paul Moran – drums
 Steve Nye – keyboards

Production
 Steve Nye – producer
 Louis Austin – engineer
 Justin Birt – assistant engineer
 Ron Kurz – engineer
 Martin Pearson – assistant engineer
 Kevin Maloney – engineer
 John Grimes – assistant engineer
 Kevin Metcalfe – mastering
 Anton Corbijn – photography
 Jill Furmanovsky – photography

Additional information
 Engineered by Martin Pearson and Ron Kurz (Power Play Studio)
 Engineered by Louis Austin (Ridge Farm Studio), Assistant engineer - Justin Birt
 Engineered by Kevin Maloney (Windmill Lane Studio), Assistant engineer - John Grimes
 Mixed at Windmill Lane Studio
 Mastered at Townhouse Studios by Kevin Metcalfe
 Sleeve direction by Mainartery
 Photography - Jill Furmanovsky
 Clannad photography by Anton Corbijn

References

External links
 This album at Northern Skyline

1985 albums
Clannad albums
Albums produced by Steve Nye
RCA Records albums